Libořice is a municipality and village in Louny District in the Ústí nad Labem Region of the Czech Republic. It has about 400 inhabitants.

Administrative parts
The village of Železná is an administrative part of Libořice.

References

Villages in Louny District